The 2015 King's Lynn and West Norfolk Borough Council election took place on 7 May 2015 to elect members of the King's Lynn and West Norfolk Borough Council in England. It was held on the same day as other local elections.

Results Summary

References

2015 English local elections
May 2015 events in the United Kingdom
2015
2010s in Norfolk